Li Chenhao (born 2 July 1977 in Beijing, China) is a Chinese baseball player who was a member of Team China at the 2008 Summer Olympics.

Sports career
1992 Beijing Lucheng Sports School (Baseball)
1994 Beijing Municipal Baseball Team
1994 National Team

Major performances
1997/2005 National Games - 1st/2nd
1998/2002 Asian Games - 4th
2003-2005 National League - 1st

References

Profile 2008 Olympics Team China

1977 births
Living people
2006 World Baseball Classic players
Baseball players at the 2008 Summer Olympics
2009 World Baseball Classic players
Beijing Tigers players
Chinese baseball players
Olympic baseball players of China
Baseball players from Beijing
Baseball players at the 1998 Asian Games
Baseball players at the 2002 Asian Games
Asian Games competitors for China